The Someșul Cald (Hungarian: Meleg-Szamos; literally "Warm Someș") is the left headwater of the river Someșul Mic in Romania. It joins the Someșul Rece in Lake Gilău, a reservoir near Gilău.

The reservoirs Mărișelu, Tarnița and Someșul Cald are located on this river.

Construction of the Tarnița – Lăpuștești Hydroelectric Power Station on the river began on June 15, 2008.

Tributaries

The following rivers are tributaries to the river Someșul Cald:

Left: Ponor, Pârâul Firei, Râșca, Agârbiciu
Right: Bătrâna, Giurcuța, Beliș, Leșul

References

Rivers of Romania
Rivers of Cluj County
Rivers of Bihor County